Phenacodontinae was a subfamily of small herbivorous mammals that were part of the Phenacodontidae family.

Genera
The subfamily contains the following genera:

 †Almogaver
 †Copecion
 †Lophocion
 †Eodesmatodon
 †Phenacodus

References

Condylarths
Mammal subfamilies